"C'est les vacances" ("It's the Holidays/Vacations") is a 2005 song recorded by the French singer Ilona Mitrecey. It was released as second single from her debut album, Un Monde parfait, on 19 July 2005. It was a great success in several countries, including France, Belgium (Wallonia) and Switzerland, although it did not manage to reach number-one.

Lyrics and music
Produced by Ivan Russo and Rosario Castagnola, the song was composed by the latter, Mixivan and Laurent Jeanne, who also performed the background vocals. The song was recorded in France and in Italy.

In this song, Ilona explains her holidays in Italy, with her friends.

Chart performances
"C'est les vacances" had a great success in France, but failed to achieve the same huge performance of Ilona's previous single, "Un Monde parfait". It went straight to number three on 25 July 2005, where it stayed for two weeks, then peaked at number two, thus surpassing "Un Monde parfait". However, this single managed to reach number two again, and "C'est les vacances" dropped to number three where it remained for three consecutive weeks, then was number four for four weeks. Thereafter, the single continued to decline. It spent twelve weeks in the top ten, 21 weeks in the top 50 and 29 weeks in the top 100.

The SNEP revealed the song was the fourth best-selling single during the first nine months of 2005, and the seventh one of the year. As of August 2014, it is the 41st best-selling single of the 21st century in France, with 451,000 units sold.

In Belgium (Wallonia), the single debuted at number 27 on 16 July on the Ultratop 40 Singles Chart, then jumped to number six. Two weeks later, the song reached a peak at number three where it stayed for four non-consecutive weeks. It totaled twelve weeks in the top ten and 17 weeks on the chart (top 40).

In Switzerland, the single was listed for 27 weeks, from 31 July 2005 to 8 January 2006. It started at number nine and reached a peak at number six for two non-consecutive weeks.

"C'est les vacances" had moderate success in Germany, where it peaked at number 61.

Track listings

 CD single - France

 CD maxi (Atello)

 CD maxi (Universal)

 Digital download

Credits and personnel

 

 Vocal : Ilona
 Music / Text : Laurent Jeanne, Mixivan, Rosario Castagnola
 Artistic producers : Ivan Russo, Rosario Castagnola
 Executive producer : Ivan Russo 
 Guitar, bass and whistle : Rosario Castagnola

 Add vocal : Laurent Jeanne
 Mixed by : Ivan Russo
 Design and graphic : Stéphane Mit for Costume3pièces.
 Recording at Moneypenny Studio, Paris, France, Atollo Recording Studio, Naples, Italy, and at Studio Eclisse, Milan, Italy

Charts and sales

Peak positions

Year-end charts

Sales

References

2005 singles
Ilona Mitrecey songs
2005 songs